Disc golf is a popular sport in the United States played at the recreational, club, and international competition levels.

Popularity 
In 2018, the PDGA counted 36,993 active members, 6,316 courses, and 3,068 disc golf tournaments in the United States. In 2021, PDGA counted over 50,000 active members and 9,454 courses.

Courses 
The world's first permanent disc golf course went into the ground in 1975 at Oak Grove Park in Los Angeles County, California.

Approximately 75% of the world's disc golf courses are located in the United States. Some of the most notable ones include DeLaveaga, Maple Hill, Blue Ribbon Pines, Brewster Ridge, Diamond X, and Milo McIver. Iowa, Kansas, and the Dakotas have the most courses per capita, whereas Massachusetts, Ohio, Connecticut, Wisconsin, and Delaware have the most courses per square mile of dry land. Texas, Wisconsin, and Minnesota have the most courses overall.

, there are  known disc golf courses in the United States on the official PDGA Course Directory.

Organizations

California 

 San Diego Aces Disc Golf Club - San Diego
 San Francisco Disc Golf Club - San Francisco
 DeLaveaga Disc Golf Club - Santa Cruz

Colorado 

 Mile High Disc Golf Club - Arvada
Louisiana

•Shreveport-Bossier City Disc Golf Union (SBDGU) - Shreveport

North Carolina 

 Rocky Mount Disc Golf - Rocky Mount

South Carolina 

 Blown Keg Disc Golf Club - Greenville

Texas 

 Funkytown Flyers - Dallas–Fort Worth metroplex
 Lewisville Disc Golf Club - Lewisville
 San Antonio Disc Club - San Antonio
 Houston Flying Disc Society - Houston
 Alamo Community Disc Club - San Antonio

Manufacturers 

The largest disc golf manufacturers including Innova, DGA, and Discraft are headquartered in the United States and produce most of their products in the country. Dynamic Discs is based in Emporia, Kansas, and the company's discs are manufactured by Latitude 64˚, a Swedish disc golf manufacturer.

Mass Media

Magazines 
Notable disc golf magazines published in the United States include DiscGolfer, the official publication of the Professional Disc Golf Association, as well as Chasin' the Chains Magazine and Physics of Flight Magazine, both by Dynamic Discs.

Podcasts 
Notable disc golf podcasts recorded in the United States include PDGA Radio, Ultiworld Disc Golf's The Upshot, Showmez, and Disc Golf Answer Man, co-hosted by Eric McCabe.

Streaming 
 Disc Golf Network – 6,500 subscribers and 4,000 concurrent viewers during the Disc Golf Pro Tour

YouTube channels 
 JomezPro – 200,000 subscribers and 72,437,374 views
 Central Coast Disc Golf – 93,200 subscribers and 31,870,696 views
 Simon Lizotte – 72,100 subscribers and 7,732,815 views
 DynamicDiscs – 51,300 subscribers and 12,013,566 views
 Disc Golf Pro Tour – 47,000 subscribers and 6,673,330 views
 thediscgolfguy – 43,900 subscribers and 11,920,365 views
 Innova Discs – 31,100 subscribers and 3,532,155 views
 Par Save Productions - 29,245 subscribers and 2,394,668 views 
Best Disc Golf Discs – 23,600 subscribers and 1,616,671 views
 Foundation Disc Golf – 20,700 subscribers and 2,050,074 views
 Johnny Discgolf – 15,000 subscribers and 897,922 views
 Drew Gibson – 13,000 subscribers and 533,240 views
 Disc Golf Nerd – 9,240 subscribers and 1,841,279 views

Competitions 
 United States Amateur Disc Golf Championships
 United States Disc Golf Championship (USDGC)

Notable American disc golfers

See also 
 Disc golf in Estonia
 Disc golf in Finland

References

External links 

 United States Disc Golf Championship website
 Professional Disc Golf Association official website
 United States Youth Disc Golf Association official website
 Disc Store USA, An Option to Get PDGA Approved Disc Golf Accessories